Chorpan Shib (also Romanized as Chorpān Shīb) is a village in Ashar Rural District, Ashar District, Mehrestan County, Sistan and Baluchestan Province, Iran. At the 2006 census, its population was 56, in 13 families.

References 

Populated places in Mehrestan County